Christians for Fair Witness on the Middle East is a Christian organization working to correct bias against Israel in the North American Christian community.

National Director Sr. Ruth Lautt, OP, Esq., told a reporter that she believes that the "one-sided, unbalanced approach" on the Middle East taken by many mainline churches is the result of "shallow understanding" of the Arab-Israel conflict. In 2008, Fair Witness worked with members of the United Methodist Church to stop the denomination from divesting from its investments in Israeli companies.

References

External links
 Official Website

Non-governmental organizations involved in the Israeli–Palestinian conflict
Christian advocacy groups